The term Banate (not to be confused with term Banat) can refer to:

Administration
 An alternate term for "banovina" (specially for largest administrative units in Kingdom of Yugoslavia from 1929 to 1941).

History

Middle Ages

Today in Bosnia and Herzegovina
 Banate of Bosnia, de facto independent medieval Bosnian state prior to emergence of the kingdom.
 Banate of Jajce, after the fall of Bosnian Kingdom a province of the medieval Kingdom of Hungary.
 Banate of Srebrenik, after the fall of Bosnian Kingdom a province of the medieval Kingdom of Hungary.

Today in Croatia
 Banate of Slavonia, a province of the medieval Kingdom of Hungary.
 Banate of Croatia, a province of the medieval Kingdom of Hungary.

Today in Romania
 Banate of Severin, a province of the medieval Kingdom of Hungary.

Today in Serbia
 Banate of Mačva, a province of the medieval Kingdom of Hungary.
 Banate of Belgrade, a province of the medieval Kingdom of Hungary.
 Banate of Kučevo, a province of the medieval Kingdom of Hungary.
 Banate of Braničevo, a province of the medieval Kingdom of Hungary.

Modern
 Banate of Lugoj and Caransebeș, a province of the early modern Kingdom of Hungary and Principality of Transylvania.
 Banate of Craiova, a province on the western part of Wallachia.
 Banate of Leitha, was a short-lived western Hungarian state that existed in 1921.

Yugoslavia 1929–1941
 Banate of Danube (Dunavska banovina), 1929–1941; capital: Novi Sad.
 Banate of Drava (Dravska banovina), 1929–1941; capital: Ljubljana.
 Banate of Drina (Drinska banovina), 1929–1941; capital: Sarajevo
 Banate of Primorje (Primorska banovina), 1929–1939; capital: Split.
 Banate of Morava (Moravska banovina), 1929–1941; capital: Niš.
 Banate of Sava (Savska banovina), 1929–1939; capital: Zagreb.
 Banate of Vardar (Vardarska banovina), 1929–1941; capital: Skopje.
 Banate of Vrbas (Vrbaska banovina), 1929–1941; capital: in Banja Luka.
 Banate of Zeta (Zetska banovina), 1929–1941; capital: in Cetinje.
 Banate of Croatia (Banovina Hrvatska), 1939–1941; capital: in Zagreb.

Geography
 Banate, Iloilo, a municipality in the Philippines.

Ethnology
 Banate or Bannock, Native American people.

See also
 Banovina (disambiguation)
 Banat (disambiguation)